Mirpur Mathelo is a city in Ghotki District, Sindh province, Pakistan. The city is administratively subdivided into ten union councils. It is the 97th largest city in Pakistan with a population of 100,760 according to 2017 census. It is the location of Moomal Ji Mari.

Topography
Mirpur Mathelo is a plain land with many trees, which is mostly Eucalyptus, Acacia Nilotica. Cultivation is widely found in the area. Wheat, rice and cotton are widely cultivated. Banana, Mango and date trees are excessively found here. Lands are irrigated both by tube wells and canals.Mirpur Mathelo is oldest town of Sindh Province In this town A very large Govt High School and Boys Degree Collage and Girls Degree Collage.In Mirpur Mathelo town a Technical and IT Institute which name is Siscom Technologies Mirpur Mathelo (https://www.siscomtek.com/) and a library.

Drainage
Masu Vah (Canal) flows in the suburb of the city just near the site of Fauji Fertilizer Company Limited. It is the main source of water used for the cultivation of land. It is also a source of fish for local fishermen.

Rain
Although the amount is good it is not reliable as it happens only during the monsoon seasons and rarely occurs other than this period.

Religion

Most of the people in Mirpur Mathelo are Muslims living here and in this town is here very famous Saint Syed Anwar Shah (jhanpur Sharif) and Sayed Jalil Shah Bukhari on Jarwar road near about 5 kilometers from Mirpur Mathelo Town and many others Saint and Scholar belong from here. The historic Shadani Darbar is located in here.

Economy
In Ten Kilometers area between this city and Daharki has major Pakistani industries i.e. Fauji Fertilizer Company Limited, Mari Gas Company, Liberty Power Plant and Engro Fertilizer Plant of Engro Corporation.

Shops
Compared with other areas of Pakistan the city has more Hindu vendors. The city is rising city and has too many investors. Mirpur Mathelo is growing fast as compare to other cities of this district .

Fauji Fertilizer Company Limited 
Fauji Fertilizer Company Limited has three plants all over Pakistan and together they are a valuable asset to the economy. Two are situated at Machi Goth, Sadiqabad lies in next province Punjab while the other is established here. Largest fertilizer producer in Pakistan, it has also gained a prominent position in Mirpur Mathelo. Almost everyone knows about it. One reason for that are the various social welfare projects that have been completed here ranging from Sona Welfare Hospital to Sona Public School & College. 
FFC has also provided a lot of Job Opportunities for Mathelians and has thus improved conditions of the area since its establishment in 2002. It is a valuable asset of Pakistan.

Unions
The unions of the city are:
 
Dhangro, Garhi Chaker, Jarwar, Mirpur mathelo-1, Jahan khan unar, Sono Pitafi, Wahi Ghoto, Yaro Lund, Islam Khan Lashari and Dino Mako,

References

Cities and towns in Ghotki District
Talukas of Sindh